Ensival is a town of Wallonia and a district of the municipality of Verviers, located in the province of Liège, Belgium.  

Before the merging of the Belgian municipalities in 1977, it was a municipality of its own.

External links 
 
Tourist information office of the Pays de Vesdre

Verviers
Former municipalities of Liège Province